Pselaphodes is a genus of rove beetles.

Species
 Pselaphodes aculeus Yin, Li & Zhao, 2010
 Pselaphodes anhuianus Yin & Li, in Yin, Hlaváč & Li, 2013
 Pselaphodes daii Yin & Hlaváč, in, Yin, Hlaváč & Li, 2013
 Pselaphodes grebennikovi Yin & Hlaváč, in, Yin, Hlaváč & Li, 2013
 Pselaphodes hainanensis Yin & Li, in, Yin, Hlaváč & Li, 2013
 Pselaphodes kuankuoshuiensis Yin & Li, in, Yin, Hlaváč & Li, 2013
 Pselaphodes longilobus Yin & Hlaváč, in, Yin, Hlaváč & Li, 2013
 Pselaphodes maoershanus Yin & Li, 2012
 Pselaphodes monoceros Yin & Hlaváč, in Yin, Hlaváč & Li, 2013
 Pselaphodes pectinatus Yin, Li & Zhao, 2011
 Pselaphodes pengi Yin & Li, in Yin, Hlaváč & Li, 2013
 Pselaphodes tianmuensis Yin, Li & Zhao, 2010
 Pselaphodes tiantongensis Yin & Li, in, Yin, Hlaváč & Li, 2013
 Pselaphodes wrasei Yin & Li, in, Yin, Hlaváč & Li, 2013
 Pselaphodes walkeri Sharp, 1892

References

External links
 Encyclopedia of Life entry

Pselaphitae
Pselaphinae genera